Zimbor is a commune located in Sălaj County, Romania. It is composed of five villages: Chendremal (Kendermál), Dolu (Almásdál), Sutoru (Zutor), Sâncraiu Almașului (Topaszentkirály) and Zimbor. It is situated in the historical region of Transylvania.

Sights 
 Wooden Church in Zimbor, built in the 17th century, historic monument
 Wooden Church in Chendremal, built in the 19th century (1851)
 Zsombory Castle in Zimbor, built in the 19th century, historic monument
 Optatiana, castra in the Roman province of Dacia

References

Communes in Sălaj County
Localities in Transylvania